The Virginia, also known as the Casa Shelby Apartments, is a historic apartment building located in the Lower West Side neighborhood of Buffalo, Erie County, New York. It was built about 1900, and is a three-story, Colonial Revival style brick building. It sits on a stone foundation and full basement.  The building houses 24 apartments and was originally designed for young middle-class tenants.

It was listed on the National Register of Historic Places in 2017.

References

Residential buildings on the National Register of Historic Places in New York (state)
Colonial Revival architecture in New York (state)
Residential buildings completed in 1900
Buildings and structures in Buffalo, New York
National Register of Historic Places in Buffalo, New York